Gabriele Nelli (born 4 December 1993) is an Italian male volleyball player. He is part of the Italy men's national volleyball team. On club level he plays for Trentino Volley.

Sporting achievements

Clubs

CEV Champions League
  2015/2016 - with Trentino Diatec

Club World Championship
  Poland 2018 – with Trentino Volley
  Brazil 2022 – with Trentino Itas

National championships
 2016/2017  Italian Championship, with Diatec Trentino
 2022/2023  Italian Cup, with Itas Trentino

References

External links

 Gabriele Nelli at the International Volleyball Federation
 

1993 births
Living people
Italian men's volleyball players
Volleyball players at the 2015 European Games
European Games competitors for Italy
Trentino Volley players
VC Belogorie players